Gadolinium diiodide is an inorganic compound, with the chemical formula of GdI2. It is an electride, with the ionic formula of Gd3+(I−)2e−, and therefore not a true gadolinium(II) compound. It is ferromagnetic at 276 K with a saturation magnetization of 7.3  B; it exhibits a large negative magnetoresistance (~70%) at 7 T near room temperature. It can be obtained by reacting gadolinium and gadolinium(III) iodide at a high temperature:

 Gd + 2 GdI3 → 3 GdI2

It can react with hydrogen at high temperature (800 °C) to obtain gadolinium hydrogen iodide (GdI2H0.97).

References 

Gadolinium compounds
Iodides
Electrides
Ferromagnetic materials